Reza Pahlavi may refer to:

 Reza Shah (1878–1944),  Reza Shah Pahlavi, Shah of Iran from 1925 until 1941
 Mohammad Reza Pahlavi (1919–1980), Shah of Iran from 1941 to 1979, son of Reza Shah
 Reza Pahlavi, Crown Prince of Iran (born 1960), son of Mohammad Reza Pahlavi